Feigenbaum is a German surname meaning "fig tree". Notable people with the surname include:

 Armand V. Feigenbaum (1922-2014), American quality control expert
 B. J. Feigenbaum (1900-1984), American legislator and lawyer
 Clive Feigenbaum, stamp dealer
 Edward Feigenbaum (born 1936), American computer scientist known as the "father of expert systems"
 Joan Feigenbaum (born 1958), American computer scientist
 Mitchell Feigenbaum (1944-2019), American mathematical physicist
 William M. Feigenbaum (1886–1949), New York assemblyman, 1918
 Yehoshua Feigenbaum (born 1947), Israeli footballer
Eran Feigenbaum (born 1974), Israeli information security expert and mentalist

See also
 Feigenbaum function
 Feigenbaum constants

Jewish surnames
German-language surnames

de:Feigenbaum